Commissioned officers' rank comparison chart of all land forces of NATO member states.

Officers (OF 1–10)

Warrant officers (WO1–5) 
Warrant officers (WOs) and chief warrant officers (CWOs) in the US military rank below officers but above officer candidates and enlisted servicemen. The first warrant officer rank, WO1 does not have a "commission" associated with it, instead having a "warrant" from the secretary of the army. Warrant officers are allowed the same courtesies as a commissioned officer, but may have some restrictions on their duties that are reserved for commissioned officers. Warrant officers usually receive a commission once they are promoted to chief warrant officer 2 (CW2/CWO2).  WO1s may be appointed by commission as stated in title 10 USC.

See also 
 Ranks and insignia of NATO
 Ranks and insignia of NATO armies enlisted
 Ranks and insignia of NATO air forces enlisted
 Ranks and insignia of NATO air forces officers
 Ranks and insignia of NATO navies enlisted
 Ranks and insignia of NATO navies officers

Notes

References 

 STANAG 2116 NATO chart

External links 
 History of NATO – the Atlantic Alliance - UK Government site
 NATO codes for grades of military personnel in STANAG 2116

Military ranks of NATO